This is a list of foreign ministers of Saint Vincent and the Grenadines.

1979–1984: Hudson K. Tannis
1984–1992: James Fitz-Allen Mitchell
1992–1994: Herbert Young
1994–1998: Alpian Allen
1998–2001: Allan Cruickshank
2001–2005: Louis Straker
2005: Mike Browne
2005–2010: Louis Straker (from 2006, Sir Louis Straker)
2010–2013: Douglas Slater
2013–2015: Camillo Gonsalves
2015–2020: Sir Louis Straker
2020–2022: Ralph Gonsalves
From 2022: Keisal M. Peters

References

Sources
Rulers.org – Foreign ministers S–Z

Foreign
Foreign Ministers
Politicians
Foreign Ministers of Saint Vincent and the Grenadines